David Murgia (born 16 March 1988) is a Belgian actor. He started his career in theatre in the early 2000s and has since gone on to appear in films.

Theater

Filmography

References

External links

1988 births
20th-century Belgian male actors
21st-century Belgian male actors
Belgian male film actors
Belgian male stage actors
Living people
Magritte Award winners